Keatley Surveying v Teranet is a judgment of the Supreme Court of Canada on issues of copyright, specifically Crown copyright, and intellectual property. It was released in September 2019.

Synopsis
The appellant brought a motion in 2007 to certify a class action on behalf of all land surveyors in Ontario who registered or deposited plans of survey in the provincial land registry offices. It claimed that the respondent, who as agent of the Crown, trespassed on the copyright of the land surveyors who had generated the work. The appellant failed to convince the trial judge, failed to sway the Court of Appeal, and failed to persuade the SCC of the rightness of its cause. The judges were very concerned about the public interest, and the clear public character of the works.

The concurrence judgment, which begins at ¶92, hinged on the interpretation of section 12 of the Copyright Act.

References

Supreme Court of Canada cases
2019 in Canadian case law
Canadian copyright case law
Interest
Class action case law in Canada
Surveying of Canada